The 2013 Tampines Rovers season saw the team compete in the 2013 S.League. They also competed in the 2013 AFC Cup after winning the 2012 S.League.

Squad

Sleague

Transfers

Mid-season transfers

In

Out

Competitions

S.League

League table

Matches

Singapore Cup

Round 1

Singapore League Cup

Matches

Quarter-finals

AFC Cup

References

Tampines Rovers
2012